Belly (Original Motion Picture Soundtrack) is the soundtrack to Hype Williams' 1998 film Belly. It was released on November 3, 1998, through Def Jam Recordings and featured production from the likes of Poke & Tone, Dame Grease, Sean Combs and Swizz Beatz. The soundtrack was a success, peaking at #5 on the Billboard 200 and #2 on the Top R&B/Hip-Hop Albums, and spawned the single "Grand Finale" by rappers DMX, Ja Rule, Method Man and Nas. "Grand Finale" made it to #63 on the Hot R&B/Hip-Hop Songs and #18 on the Hot Rap Songs. Four music video singles were released for "Grand Finale", "What About", "Movin' Out" and "Tommy's Theme".

The song "Top Shotter" was used as the entrance song for John Howard at UFC 101.

Track listing

Personnel

Abdul Haqq Islam – executive producer (track 7)
Andy Katz – recording (track 13)
Anthony Grant – performer (track 16)
Anthony Harmon – bass guitar (track 1)
Anthony "CD" Kelly – producer & recording (track 8)
Anthony Kilhoffer – programming & recording (track 1)
Brian "Big Bass" Gardner – mastering (track 13)
Byron Rickerson – assistant recording (track 1)
Chandra Crawford – backing vocals (track 1)
Chris Brickley – recording (track 5)
Christopher Martin – producer (tracks: 2, 13), mixing (track 13)
Claude Reynolds – assistant engineering (track 8)
Clifford Smith – performer (track 8)
Clifford Smith Jr. – performer (track 3)
Corey Woods – performer (track 7)
Crystal M. Johnson – vocal arranger (track 7)
Cynthia Jernigan – backing vocals (tracks: 1, 5)
Damon Blackman – producer & recording (track 6)
Dave O'Donnell – assistant engineering (track 15)
David Styles – performer (track 16)
Dennis Coles – performer (track 14)
Derrick Trotman – producer (track 10)
Dexter Thibou – assistant engineering (track 13)
Doug Wilson – mixing (track 7)
Dragan Čačinović-Čač – recording (track 7)
Dwight Equan Grant – performer (track 10)
Earl Simmons – performer (tracks: 3, 8)
Ed Raso – recording (track 4)
Eddie Sancho – engineering (track 13)
Eugene Gray – performer (track 18)
Franchon Priolenau – A&R
Gail Hansen – A&R
Gordon Chambers – backing vocals & vocal producer (track 4)
Greg Landfair – guitar (track 1)
Harold "Hype" Williams – executive producer
Irving Domingo Lorenzo Jr. – producer (tracks: 3, 9), A&R, executive producer
Jabari Jones – performer (track 18)
Jason Phillips – performer (track 16)
Jasun Wardlaw – performer (track 17)
Jean-Claude Olivier – producer (track 18)
Jean-Marie Horvat – mixing (track 4)
Jeff Vereb – assistant mixing (track 1)
Jeffrey Atkins – performer (tracks: 3, 9)
Jeffrey Backues Neal – performer & producer (track 16)
Jeffery "J Dub" Walker – producer (track 4)
Jermain Baxter – performer (track 18)
Jerome Childers – performer (track 4)
Jerome Foster – producer (track 7)
Joey Donatello – programming & recording (track 1)
John Bynoe – producer (track 16)
John Montagnese – assistant recording (track 13)
Julie Greenwald – management
Kasseem Dean – producer (track 12)
Ken "Duro" Ifill – mixing (tracks: 3, 9, 18)
Kendall D. Nesbitt – backing vocals & keyboards (track 1)
Kenny Ortiz – recording (track 16)
Kevin Crouse – mixing (track 11)
Keith Edward Elam – performer & co-producer (track 13)
Kimberly A. Jefferson – backing vocals (track 1)
Kristin A. Partee – backing vocals (track 1)
Lamont Porter – producer (track 11)
Larry Sturm – programming & recording (track 1)
Lyor Cohen – executive producer
LaVita Raynor – performer (track 6)
Malik Deshawn Cox – performer (track 10)
Marco Ennis – performer (track 16)
Marcus Vest – bass (track 6)
Mario Rodriguez – mixing (track 16)
Mark Hines – producer (track 17)
Melvin Jason Smalls – performer (track 12)
Michael Epps – performer (track 18)
Michael Eugene Archer – performer (track 2)
Michael J. Allen – performer (track 11)*Mike Koch – assistant engineering (track 15)
Miles "Nastee" Balochian – recording (track 17)
Mýa Harrison – performer (track 7)
Nasir bin Olu Dara Jones – performer (tracks: 3, 18)
Patrick Viala – mixing (track 8), recording (tracks: 3, 9–11)
Percy Bady – additional keyboards (track 5)
Raymond Scott – performer & producer (track 16)
Rich Keller – mixing & recording (tracks: 6, 12)
Rick Behrens – assistant recording (track 5)
Robert Diggs – performer & producer (track 14)
Robert Kelly – backing vocals & producer (tracks: 1, 5)
Robert "Lil' Rob" Mays – producer (tracks: 3, 9)
Ron Lowe – assistant mixing (track 5)
Roy Hamilton – backing vocals & drum programming (track 1)
Russell Elevado – mixing & recording (track 2)
Russell Jones – performer (track 14)
Samuel Barnes – producer (track 18)
Sean "Puffy" Combs – producer (track 4)
Sean Divine Jacobs – performer (track 16)
Sean Paul Henriques – performer (track 8)
Shawn Carter – performer (tracks: 10, 15)
Spencer Bellamy – producer (track 15)
Stan Wood – programming & recording (track 1)
Stephanie Edwards – performer (track 5)
Stephen George – mixing & recording (tracks: 1, 5), programming (track 5)
Ted Wohlsen – mixing (track 7)
Tina Davis – A&R
Todd Gaither – performer (track 15)
Thomas Coyne – mastering
Tommy Uzzo – mixing & recording (track 15)
Troy Hightower – mixing & recording (track 15)
Victor Santiago – performer (tracks: 7, 11)
William Loshawn Calhoun Jr. – performer (track 13)
William Michael Griffin Jr. – performer (track 13)
William Raynard Greer – backing vocals (track 1)

Charts

Weekly charts

Year-end charts

Certifications

References

External links

1998 soundtrack albums
1990s film soundtrack albums
Albums produced by RZA
Drama film soundtracks
Gangsta rap soundtracks
East Coast hip hop albums
Albums produced by R. Kelly
Albums produced by Irv Gotti
Albums produced by DJ Premier
Albums produced by Sean Combs
Albums produced by Dame Grease
Albums produced by Swizz Beatz
Def Jam Recordings soundtracks
Albums produced by Trackmasters
Albums recorded at Electric Lady Studios